The Râmești is a left tributary of the Pârâul Urșanilor in Romania. It flows into the Pârâul Urșanilor in Horezu.

References

Rivers of Romania
Rivers of Vâlcea County